The Battle of the Twin Tunnels took place during the Korean War. In which the UN forces inflicted heavy casualties on the People's Volunteer Army (PVA). The "Twin Tunnels" refer to a series of railroad tunnels along the Central Line in eastern Jije-myeon, Yangpyeong County, Gyeonggi-do Province, South Korea.

A series of battles, including Twin Tunnels, the Battle of Chipyong-ni and the Third Battle of Wonju between January and February 1951 marked a turning point in many ways for the entire Korean War.

Background
When U.S. X Corps commander General Edward Almond received a request from Eighth Army commander General Matthew Ridgway on 30 January for a X Corps - Republic of Korea Army (ROK) III Corps operation similar to Operation Thunderbolt, he was in the process of extending X Corps’ diversionary effort ordered earlier by
Ridgway. Searching that deep at Corps' center and right could apply pressure on the Korean People's Army (KPA) V and II Corps concentrated above Hoengsong and Pyongchang.

PVA in the high ground overlooking the tunnels quickly cut the patrol's route of withdrawal, forced the group into hasty defenses on the nearest rises of ground, and opened a series of assaults. The PVA finally backed away after air strikes were called in by the pilot of an observation plane who spotted the ambush and after a motorized company of infantry reinforced the group about 03:30 on the 30th. The waylaid patrol had suffered five dead, twenty-nine wounded, and five missing out of a total strength of forty-five. At the discovery of PVA at the twin tunnels General Almond ordered the 2nd Division to identify and destroy all enemy units in that area. The 23rd Infantry Regiment received the assignment. On 31 January Regimental Colonel Paul L. Freeman Jr. sent his 3rd Battalion and the attached French Battalion to the tunnels after placing the 37th Field Artillery Battalion within a thousand yards of the tunnel area in direct support. The infantry battalions reached and established a perimeter around the tunnel-bridge complex without sighting enemy forces. But from farther north Colonel Freeman's forces themselves were observed by the PVA 125th Division, 42nd Army.

Battle

Near dawn on 1 February the 375th and 374th Regiments attacked from the north and northeast, respectively, and after daylight the 373rd Regiment assaulted the perimeter from the northwest and southwest. In hard, close-in fighting lasting all day, the defending battalions, relying heavily on artillery fire and on more than eighty air strikes finally forced the PVA to withdraw. Freeman's forces counted 1,300 enemy bodies outside their perimeter and estimated total PVA casualties at 3,600. Their own losses were 45 killed, 207 wounded, and 4 missing.

Aftermath
Judging from the two sharp actions at the twin tunnels, the PVA appeared determined to retain control of Chip’yong-ni. They had good reason. The town was so situated that the force occupying it could control movements over Route 2 to the west, over Route 24 to the northeast, over Routes 24 and 24A below town, and thus through the Yangp’yong-Ch'ungju segment of the Han River valley stretching to the southeast behind it. Eighth Army possession of Chip’yong-ni, furthermore, would pose a threat of envelopment to enemy forces opposing I and IX Corps below the Han River. For these same reasons General Almond planned to seize Chip’yong-ni and incorporated this plan in his overall recommendations for an operation styled on Operation Thunderbolt. This force, apparently part of the KPA V Corps, could be preparing to advance southwest on Route 24 through Chip’yongni, then down the Han valley toward Yoju and Ch’ungju. Or the V Corps might again push forces south on Route 29 through Hoengsong toward Wonju. To spoil either move, Almond considered Hongcheon the proper main objective of a X Corps attack. To disrupt both the KPA V Corps and II Corps, he outlined a coordinated X Corps-ROK III Corps advance, Operation Roundup.

References

Bibliography
 David Halberstam's The Coldest Winter, 2007 ed., pages p. 505–588

External links
 The 2nd Infantry Division in Korea: Wonju and Twin Tunnels
 Combat Actions in Korea, Chapter 7: Twin Tunnels Patrol Ambush
 Map: Chipyong-ni, 13–14 February 1951 from Billy C. Mossman, Ebb and Flow: November 1950 – July 1951 (Washington, D.C.: Center of Military History, 1990)
 

Twin Tunnels
Twin Tunnels
Twin Tunnels
Twin Tunnels
February 1951 events in Asia
Battles and operations of the Korean War in 1951